Estadio Universitario Beto Ávila is a stadium in Veracruz, Mexico.  It is primarily used for baseball and is home to El Águila de Veracruz of the Mexican League. It previously served as the home stadium for the Rojos del Águila de Veracruz from 1992 to 2017.  The stadium has a capacity of 7,319 people.  Prior to this stadium they played at the Parque Deportivo Veracruzano.

The stadium is named to honor Veracruz native Beto Ávila who played for the Cleveland Indians and a few other Major League Baseball teams before returning to play his last year as a player for the Tigres del México. After retiring from active play Beto Ávila worked to further organize and advance the sport of baseball in Mexico.

References 

Baseball venues in Mexico
Mexican League ballparks
Sports venues in Veracruz
Veracruz (city)
Sports venues completed in 1992